Halsen Idrettsforening is a sports club located in Østre Halsen, Larvik, Norway. The club was founded as Halsen Ballklubb on 22 October 1933, and today it has sections for association football and handball. The men's football team currently plays in 3. divisjon, the fourth tier of the Norwegian football league system.

The club was initially founded in 1919, as a football club, but was dissolved in 1926. Halsen Ballklubb was re-founded on 22 October 1933. In 1948, the club changed its name to the current Halsen Idrettsforening.

Football

Halsen IF was founded as Halsen Ballklubb on 22 October 1933. The men's football team currently plays in 3. divisjon, the fourth tier of the Norwegian football league system. They have played in the fourth tier since they promoted from the 4. divisjon in 2015.

Current squad

Recent seasons
{|class="wikitable"
|-bgcolor="#efefef"
! Season
!
! Pos.
! Pl.
! W
! D
! L
! GS
! GA
! Pts
!Cup
!Notes
!
|-
|2015
|4. divisjon
|align=right bgcolor=#DDFFDD| 1
|align=right|20||align=right|16||align=right|1||align=right|3
|align=right|93||align=right|20||align=right|49
|First qualifying round
|
|
|-
|2016
|3. divisjon
|align=right| 6
|align=right|26||align=right|16||align=right|1||align=right|9
|align=right|71||align=right|46||align=right|49
|First round
|
|
|-
|2017
|3. divisjon
|align=right| 8
|align=right|26||align=right|11||align=right|2||align=right|13
|align=right|61||align=right|69||align=right|35
|First round
|
|
|-
|2018
|3. divisjon
|align=right| 6
|align=right|26||align=right|12||align=right|4||align=right|10
|align=right|55||align=right|42||align=right|40
|First round
|
|
|-
|2019
|3. divisjon
|align=right| 11
|align=right|26||align=right|9||align=right|2||align=right|15
|align=right|44||align=right|72||align=right|29
|Second qualifying round
|
|
|}

References

External links
 Bergeskogen Idrettspark - Nordic Stadiums

Football clubs in Norway
Sport in Vestfold og Telemark
Larvik
Association football clubs established in 1933
1933 establishments in Norway